Tammar Annika Chin (born 14 June 1983), known by her stage name Tami Chynn, is a Jamaican singer, songwriter, and dancer.

Early life
Chynn was born in Kingston, Jamaica. Her father, Richard Chin, is of Jamaican and Chinese descent and her mother, Christine Chin, also a Jamaican national, is of English and African descent. Her parents were in a band called The Carnations and her younger sister, Tessanne Chin is also a singer, best known for winning Season 5 of the US singing competition The Voice as part of Adam Levine's team.

Tami grew up in the parish of St. Andrew and attended St. Peter and Paul Preparatory School. She later attended Campion College in St. Andrew, Jamaica. In 1998, at age 14, she moved to Leamington Spa, UK where she spent three years studying the performing arts and in 2001, at age 17, moved back to Jamaica, where she worked on her music career and recorded her first single "Rock U."

In 2010, Tami collaborated with Slovakia-born fashion designer Lubica Kucerova to create the Anuna and Anuna Goddess collections. The collection debuted at 2010 Fashion Art Toronto: Alternative Arts Fashion Week. Later that year, the duo would be nominated at The Jamaica Observer Style Awards and win the Designer of the Year Award.

Music career

2005–2007: Beginnings and Out of Many... One
Before pursuing music, she toured with fellow Jamaican artist Shaggy as a backup dancer on his Caught Red Handed Tour.  In early 2005 she travelled to Los Angeles to perform for Universal Motown Records and in May she was signed to the major label, at age 24, for a four album deal. Before releasing her debut album in the US, she appeared in recordings with international Reggae stars: Beenie Man, Lady Saw and Sean Paul on his album The Trinity for the track "All on Me".

In March 2006, she was nominated for Best New Entertainer Award at the International Reggae and World Music Awards, but lost the award to reggae artist Matisyahu. Leading up to the release of her debut album, Out of Many...One she toured clubs around the US for promotion.

Later in 2006 she released her first US single "Hyperventilating" which became a hit on the internet that summer but wasn't a mainstream success. During that summer she released her first album Out of Many...One which also failed to chart in the US but managed to peak at No. 41 on the Japanese Oricon charts. In 2007 her song "Over and Over" appeared on the compilations.

2008–present: New record label and Prima Donna
In 2008, Tami was noticed by Akon, who signed her up to his label Konvict Muzik and began production of her second album Prima Donna. Recording of the album began in January in Akon's Atlanta studios with Akon and RedOne executive producing the album. Frozen (featuring Akon), the lead single for the album, was released in August 2008. In March she toured the UK and made an appearance on BBC Radio 1Xtra, on 22 March 2008 with Akon and performed Frozen.

In September 2008, she starred in a Pepsi commercial alongside Verne Troyer, T-Pain and Shaggy doing a cover of Carl Douglas' classic disco song Kung Fu Fighting with vocals from Akon. During October 2008 she opened for New Kids on the Block on their New Kids on the Block Tour alongside Lady Gaga, Natasha Bedingfield and Colby O'Donis. She also appeared in the video "I'm So Paid" by Akon. After cutting ties with Universal, Prima Donna remains unreleased; however, Tami Chynn has stated she is currently at work on a third album that is to become a second release.

In 2011, Jennifer Lopez re-recorded "Hypnotico," a song where Tami had written with Lady Gaga and RedOne and recorded for her unreleased second album Prima Donna for Lopez's seventh studio album Love? released 3 May 2011 in the United States.

As of 2014, she works as her sister Tessanne Chin's manager.

Personal life
Tami married fellow reggae/dancehall artist Wayne Marshall in 2009. The couple have four children together-3 sons (Jax 8yrs, Atlas 5yrs and Oz 2yrs) and their first daughter( Ivy 2wks)

Discography

Studio albums

Singles

As featured artist

Music videos

References

External links 
 Official Site
 Official Japan Site
 Tumblr
 Record Label Page
 Jamaicaobserver.com
 
 Fan Blog

1984 births
Living people
Musicians from Kingston, Jamaica
Jamaican dancehall musicians
21st-century Jamaican women singers
Jamaican people of English descent
Jamaican people of Chinese descent
Jamaican reggae singers
Reggae fusion artists
Synth-pop singers